Est-Mono is a prefecture located in the Plateaux Region of Togo. The prefecture seat is located in Elavagnon.

Canton (administrative divisions) of Est-Mono include Elavagnon, Nyamassila, Kamina, Morétan-Igbérioko, Kpéssi, Gbadjahè, and Badin-Copé.

References

Prefectures of Togo
Plateaux Region, Togo